This is a list of electricity-generating power stations in the U.S. state of North Carolina, sorted by type and name. In 2020, North Carolina had a total summer capacity of 35,141 MW through all of its power plants, and a net generation of 124,363 GWh.  The corresponding electrical energy generation mix was 32.0% nuclear, 31.4% natural gas, 23.4% coal, 5.7% solar, 4.7% hydroelectric, 2.3% biomass, 0.4% wind, and 0.1% petroleum.

As in other states, electricity generation by coal in North Carolina has been shifting to natural gas and renewables.  Gas has nearly equaled the generation by nuclear since 2016.   The state was also a top-ten state in the nation for production of nuclear energy.
 
By the end of 2020 North Carolina had the third-highest solar generation and installed capacity in the nation at 5,260 megawatts, surpassed only by California and Texas. Solar generation exceeded hydroelectricity in 2017. Small-scale solar including customer-owned photovoltaic panels delivered an additional net 451 GWh of energy to the state's electrical grid. This was 22 times less than the amount generated by North Carolina's utility-scale photovoltaic plants.

Nuclear power stations
Data from the U.S. Energy Information Administration.

Fossil-fuel power stations
Data from the U.S. Energy Information Administration.

Coal

Natural gas

Renewable power stations
Data from the U.S. Energy Information Administration.

Biomass and Industrial Waste

Hydroelectric

Solar

Wind

Storage power stations
Data from the U.S. Energy Information Administration.

Battery storage

Pumped storage

Cancelled
South River Nuclear Power Plant

See also

List of power stations in the United States

References

Energy infrastructure in North Carolina
North Carolina
Lists of buildings and structures in North Carolina
 
Geographic coordinate lists